Kowloon East Barracks, formerly Osborn Barracks, is a People's Liberation Army facility, and was a British Army facility, in Kowloon City District, Hong Kong. Located in the northern part of Kowloon on Waterloo Road and Junction Road (across the street from Hong Kong Baptist University).

History

The military facility was named for Canadian Army Company Sergeant Major John Robert Osborn of the Winnipeg Grenadiers. Osborn was a British-born Canadian who died defending Hong Kong in 1941. He was awarded the Victoria Cross and a barracks in Hong Kong was named in his honour in 1945 after the liberation. Osborn is memorialised at Sai Wan War Cemetery and also through a statue of an anonymous World War I soldier in Hong Kong Park on Hong Kong Island. The statue of the anonymous World War I soldier was originally part of the Eu Tong Sen statuary collection at Eucliff villa. When Eucliff villa was demolished, the Eu family donated the statue in the 1980s to Osborn Barracks in Kowloon where it stayed for 20 years before being relocated to Hong Kong Park.

Part of the land of the Osborn Barracks (the east of Renfrew Road) was given to Hong Kong Baptist University for new campus development in early 1990s. The last British Army regiment to occupy the Barracks was the Hong Kong Logistic Support Regiment RLC. After the transfer of sovereignty over Hong Kong the Osborn Barracks are used by the Chinese People's Liberation Army in Hong Kong.

A helipad is located along Renfrew Road.

In 2015, Albert Chan Wai-yip suggested that the barracks be decommissioned for more residential space.

See also
 List of army barracks in Hong Kong

References

References
 The Country Boy Who Died for Hong Kong

Kowloon Tsai
Military of Hong Kong under British rule
Barracks in Hong Kong